Julia Kotlarsky is a New Zealand academic, and as of 2018 is a full professor at the University of Auckland.

Academic career

After a 2005 PhD titled  'Management of globally distributed component-based software development projects'  at the Erasmus University Rotterdam, Kotlarsky moved to the University of Warwick, and then in 2012 joined Aston University as a full professor. In 2018 she moved to University of Auckland .

Much of Kotlarsky's research relates to outsourcing and offshoring.

Selected works 
 Kotlarsky, Julia, and Ilan Oshri (2005) "Social ties, knowledge sharing and successful collaboration in globally distributed system development projects." European Journal of Information Systems 14(1), pp. 37–48.
 Oshri, Ilan, Julia Kotlarsky, and Leslie P. Willcocks (2015) The Handbook of Global Outsourcing and Offshoring 3rd Edition. Springer.
 Oshri, Ilan, Julia Kotlarsky, and Leslie P. Willcocks (2007) "Managing dispersed expertise in IT offshore outsourcing: Lessons from Tata Consultancy Services." MIS Quarterly Executive 6 (2).
 Nevo, Dorit and Julia Kotlarsky (2014) “Primary Vendor Capabilities in a Mediated Outsourcing Model: Can IT Service Providers Leverage Crowdsourcing?“, Decision Support Systems, 65, pp. 17–27.
 Kotlarsky, Julia, Scarbrough, Harry and Ilan Oshri (2014) “Coordinating expertise across knowledge boundaries in offshore-outsourcing projects: The role of codification”, MIS Quarterly, 38 (2), pp. 607-627 (Open Access)
 Kotlarsky, Julia, van den Hooff, Bart and Leonie Houtman (2015) “Are We on the Same Page? Knowledge Boundaries and Transactive Memory System Development in Cross-functional Teams”, Communication Research, 42 (3), pp. 319–344. 
 Oshri, Ilan, Kotlarsky, Julia and Alexandra Gerbasi (2015) “Strategic Innovation Through Outsourcing: The Role of Relational and Contractual Governance”, Journal of Strategic Information Systems, 24(3), pp. 203–216.
 Kotlarsky, Julia, Oshri, Ilan, Dibbern, Jens and Deepa Mani (2020) “Information Systems Sourcing” - by invitation MIS Quarterly Research Curation article (available online on MIS Quarterly Research Curations https://www.misqresearchcurations.org). (Second updated version, first version was published in 2018)
 Oshri, Ilan, Henfridsson, Ola and Julia Kotlarsky (2018) “Re-representation as Work Design in Outsourcing: A Semiotic View”, MIS Quarterly, 42(1), pp. 1-23 (Open Access).
 Oshri, Ilan, Sidhu, Jatinder and Julia Kotlarsky (2019) “Why Dissatisfaction with Offshore-Outsourcing may not Lead to Backsourcing? A Behavioral Analysis”, Journal of Business Research,  special issue on Outsourcing and Offshoring decisions, Vol 103 pp. 644-653
 Oshri, Ilan, Dibbern, Jens, Kotlarsky, Julia and Oliver Krancher (2019) “An Information Processing View on Joint Vendor Performance in Multi-Sourcing: The Role of the Guardian”. Journal of Management Information Systems, 36(4)
 Sen, Sanjoy, Kotlarsky, Julia and Pawan Budhwar (2020) “Extending Organizational Boundaries Through Outsourcing: Towards a Dynamic Risk Management Capability Framework”, Academy of Management Perspective, 34(1)
 Kotlarsky, Julia, Van Den Hooff, Bart and Leonie Houtman (2020) “Under Pressure: Understanding Dynamics of Coordination in IT Functions Supporting Traditional and Fast-response Organizations”, Journal of Information Technology, 35(2)
 Nevo, Dorit and Julia Kotlarsky (2020) “Crowdsourcing as a Strategic IS Sourcing Phenomenon: Critical Review and Insights for Future Research”. Journal of Strategic Information Systems.

References

External links
 
 
 

Living people
New Zealand women academics
Erasmus University Rotterdam alumni
Academics of the University of Warwick
Academic staff of the University of Auckland
Information systems researchers
Year of birth missing (living people)
New Zealand women writers
Academics of Aston University